Robert William Scott may refer to:
 Bobby Scott (musician), American musician, record producer, and songwriter
 Bobby Scott (Australian footballer), Australian rules footballer
 Bob Scott (Queensland politician)